= District Health Information Management System =

Ghanaian healthcare information platform

The District Health Information Management System (DHIMS) is a digital health information platform in Ghana. It collects, manages, and analyses routine health service data across the national healthcare system. This data supports reporting from health facilities to district, regional and national levels, and also informing planning and monitoring, and policy decisions.

== History ==
The Ghana Health Service introduced the DHIMS platform to strengthen health information systems and replace fragmented, paper-based reporting. The upgraded version, known as DHIMS2, was deployed nationwide in 2012 and expanded to cover all health districts in Ghana. The system aims to enhance health data management in low- and middle-income countries. These countries health information systems have historically struggled with duplication, delays, and incomplete reporting.

== Structure and functionality ==
DHIMS is an integrated platform designed for collecting, storing, processing and disseminating health data. It enables health facilities including public, private, and faith-based providers to submit routine service data into a centralized system accessible at various administrative levels. This system supports both online and offline data entry and offers tools for data visualization, reporting, and performance monitoring. Users can track key health indicators, compare service delivery metrics across regions, and generate reports for planning and evaluation.

== Coverage and use ==
One study found that the system has improved data availability and minimized delays in information transmission within the health sector. Another study suggests that while data reporting rates are relatively high, the use of DHIMS data for decision-making, especially at lower health system levels, remains limited. Ongoing challenges include capacity constraints and limited analytical use of data.

Some studies have used data from the DHIMS2 to monitor trends in health Indicators such as maternal health outcomes and patterns of disease over time.
